Andrés Patricio Oroz Peñaloza (born August 2, 1980) is a Chilean former footballer who played as midfielder.

Club career
Professional debut in July 1998 by playing a match against Santiago Morning Deportes Antofagasta. He spent many years in all in the microbuseros, but fell to second division and went to Universidad de Concepción, where he had good campaigns along with his coach Fernando Díaz.

He had a good campaign in the penquista cast sign of Puebla F.C. in Mexico and 2005 reached Universidad de Chile. In the second half of 2005 he joined the ranks of Unión Española, which came to be club champion in the Apertura. After signing in Antofagasta, who led his former club coach at the Universidad de Concepción, Fernando Díaz. Then come to Rangers, the 2009 play by Palestino, and 2010 play in Ñublense, his current club.

International career
He joined the Chilean under-23 selection who achieved the bronze medal at the 2000 Sydney Olympics.

Personal life
Oroz is the uncle of the professional footballer Alexander Oroz. In addition, his brother and Alexander's father, Antonio, was with the Colo-Colo youth ranks and plays football at amateur level as a left midfielder.

Honours

National Team
  U23
 Olympic Games:  in Sydney (2000)

References

External links
 
 

1980 births
Living people
Footballers from Santiago
Chilean footballers
Chilean expatriate footballers
Santiago Morning footballers
Universidad de Concepción footballers
Club Puebla players
Universidad de Chile footballers
Unión Española footballers
C.D. Antofagasta footballers
Rangers de Talca footballers
Club Deportivo Palestino footballers
Ñublense footballers
Cobreloa footballers
Chilean Primera División players
Liga MX players
Chilean expatriate sportspeople in Mexico
Expatriate footballers in Mexico
Footballers at the 2000 Summer Olympics
Olympic footballers of Chile
Olympic bronze medalists for Chile
Olympic medalists in football
Medalists at the 2000 Summer Olympics
Association football midfielders